Tomislav Franjković (May 19, 1931 – October 11, 2010) was a Croat water polo player who competed for Yugoslavia in the 1956 Summer Olympics.

He was part of the Yugoslav team which won the silver medal in the 1956 tournament. He played six matches.

See also
 List of Olympic medalists in water polo (men)

References
Tomislav Franjković's obituary

External links
 

1931 births
2010 deaths
Croatian male water polo players
Yugoslav male water polo players
Olympic water polo players of Yugoslavia
Water polo players at the 1956 Summer Olympics
Olympic silver medalists for Yugoslavia
Olympic medalists in water polo
Medalists at the 1956 Summer Olympics